The 1935 Cambridge University by-election was held on 23 February 1935.  The by-election was held due to the resignation of the incumbent Conservative MP, Godfrey Wilson.  It was won by the unopposed Conservative candidate Kenneth Pickthorn.

References

1935 elections in the United Kingdom
1935 in England
20th century in Cambridge
February 1935 events
By-elections to the Parliament of the United Kingdom in Cambridge University
Unopposed by-elections to the Parliament of the United Kingdom (need citation)